All Saints Records is a British independent record label. It was established in 1991 by Dominic Norman-Taylor. The label has published ambient music by Brian Eno and Biosphere.

History

All Saints Records was founded in 1991, named after a street in West London.  The first releases were from Opal Records/Land Records which had closed that year as Opal (Brian Eno's management company) wanted to concentrate on artist management rather than being a label. All Saints continued to build upon those initial releases with new acts as well as with artists already associated with the label.

All Saints generally explores the areas where Ambient music embraces other genres of music, but its recent policy of branching out does not seem to have excluded its established artists.  Much of the earlier catalogue however is pure ambient. Many of the albums are almost iconic in their stature, such as Biosphere's 1997 Substrata.

The label was distributed by Vital Records and later moved to Pinnacle Records.  All Saints Records was almost silent from 2001 to 2004, but it was relaunched after Norman-Taylor returned from a period with the UN and a NGO in a deal with Rykodisc. In 2012 the label signed a co-operative deal with Warp Records.

The artwork of the label's releases plays an important part in its general culture and its interest in the visual as well as the musical is very apparent. For example, the label has released three artworks by Eno, Mistaken Memories of Mediaeval Manhattan, Thursday Afternoon (on a single DVD) and 77 Million Paintings.

Roster
 Dallas Acid
 Biosphere
 Michael Brook
 Harold Budd
 John Cale
 Channel Light Vessel
 Brian Eno
 Roger Eno
 Djivan Gasparyan
 Jon Hassell
 Daniel Lanois
 Laraaji
 Hugo Largo
 Marconi Union
 Bill Nelson
 Roedelius
 Kate St John
 Vacabou
 Jah Wobble

See also
 Lists of record labels

References

External links
 Official site
 Discography of All Saints at Discogs

 
British independent record labels
Record labels established in 1991
Ambient music record labels
1991 establishments in the United Kingdom